Karl Bruns (born 1925) is a retired West German slalom canoeist who competed in the early-to-mid 1950s. He won a bronze medal in the folding K-1 team event at the 1953 ICF Canoe Slalom World Championships in Meran.

References

External links 
 Karl RATH at CanoeSlalom.net

German male canoeists
Possibly living people
1925 births
Medalists at the ICF Canoe Slalom World Championships